At the 2013 Jeux de la Francophonie, the athletics events were held at Stade Charles-Ehrmann from September 10 to September 14. The host country, France, topped the medal table in front of Poland and Canada. A total of 8 Games records was bettered during the competition.

Medal summary

Men

Women

Medal table

Participating nations

 (4)
 (3)
 (9)
 (4)
 (1)
 (10)
 (58)
 (4)
 (4)
 (2)
 (2)
 (1)
 (3)
 (4)
 (63)
 (2)
 (1)
 (1)
 (7)
 (4)
 (13)
 (2)
 (4)
 (13)
 (1)
 (23)
 (8)
 (4)
 (22)
 (10)
 (10)
 (3)
 (17)
 (2)
 (1)
 (10)
 (3)
 (4)
 (23)
 (11)
 (11)
 (20)

References

Men's medals
Women's medals
Full results
Livre de resultats

IAAF daily reports
Day one report
Day two report
Day three report
Day four report
Day five report

Francophonie
Athletics
2013